Sorkhan may refer to:
 Sorkhan, Arzuiyeh
 Sorkhan, Shahr-e Babak